Lützow can refer to:

 Lützow, Germany, a municipality in the district of Nordwestmecklenburg in Mecklenburg-Western Pomerania in Germany
 Lützow, original name of Charlottenburg
 Ludwig Adolf Wilhelm von Lützow (1782–1834), a Prussian lieutenant general
 Lützow Free Corps, a Prussian volunteer force during the Napoleonic wars commanded by Ludwig von Lützow
 German cruiser Lützow, several ships named for Ludwig von Lützow
 37th SS Volunteer Cavalry Division Lützow, a cavalry division of the Waffen-SS named for Ludwig von Lützow
 Ludwig von Lützow (politician) (1793–1872), a Mecklenburg politician
 Francis Lützow (1849–1916), Czech historian
 Günther Lützow (1912–1945), German World War II fighter pilot and flying ace
 Kampfgeschwader Lützow, a German movie of 1941